Jordy Bruijn (born 23 July 1996) is a Dutch professional footballer who plays as an attacking midfielder for NEC in the Eredivisie.

Career
Bruijn is a youth exponent from AFC Ajax. He made his professional debut with Jong Ajax on 6 November 2015 in an Eerste Divisie game against MVV Maastricht replacing Milan Vissie after 75 minutes. After suffering several injuries, he played one match for Jong Ajax in the 2015–16 season.

In May 2016, Bruijn signed a one-year deal with SC Heerenveen.

On 31 January 2019, it was announced that Bruijn was sent on loan to NEC Nijmegen for the remainder of the season. A day later, he made his debut in the 4–1 won home win against Jong FC Utrecht. On 23 February, he scored his first goal for NEC in the 5–0 home win over Almere City. He made an impression during his loan period, where he made 16 appearances and scored twice. After barely playing after his return to Heerenveen, he made a permanent move to NEC in the summer of 2020. He signed a three-year contract in Nijmegen. There, he immediately became a starter, in a two-man midfield where Édgar Barreto, Javier Vet and Dirk Proper also fought for playing time. In the absence of Rens van Eijden, Bruijn was team captain of the club. On 23 May 2021, Bruijn won promotion with NEC to the Eredivisie, by beating NAC Breda 2–1 in the final of the play-offs. In the play-offs that season, Bruijn had been an important factor, scoring a goal and providing two assists.

References

External links
 

1996 births
Living people
Footballers from Amsterdam
Association football midfielders
Dutch footballers
Jong Ajax players
SC Heerenveen players
NEC Nijmegen players
Eredivisie players
Eerste Divisie players